Joy Gregory (born 1959) is a British artist. Gregory's work explores concerns related to race, gender and cultural differences in contemporary society. Her work has been published and exhibited worldwide and is held in the collections of the Victoria and Albert Museum and Government Art Collection in the UK.

Life and work
Gregory was born in Bicester in 1959 to Jamaican parents. She grew up Buckinghamshire and went on to study at Manchester Polytechnic and the Royal College of Art.

Gregory's techniques range from digital video installations to Victorian printing techniques.

In 2019, Gregory was awarded an Honorary Fellowship of the Royal Photographic Society.

The exhibition Lost languages and other voices in 2011 at Impressions Gallery in Bradford was the first major retrospective of her work spanning over 20 years.

Selected exhibitions
1987 Polareyes: Black Women Photographers, Camden Arts Centre, London
 1990 Autoportaits, Camerawork, London
1990 Ecstatic Antibodies: Resisting the AIDS Mythology, Ikon Gallery, Birmingham
1992, Who Do You Take Me For? Institute of Modern Art, Brisbane
1995 4th Istanbul Biennal, Istanbul, Turkey
 1999 Beauty Project, Pallant House, Chicester
 1998 Blonde, Metro Cinema, London
 2011 Lost Languages and other voices, Impressions Gallery, Bradford

Selected bibliography
Joy Gregory. London: Autograph, Association of Black Photographers, 1994. .
Objects of beauty. London: Autograph, Association of Black Photographers, 2004. .

Collections
Gregory's work is held in the following permanent collections:
Victoria and Albert Museum, London
Government Art Collection, UK

References

Further reading
Joy Gregory, Lost Languages and other voices: Exhibition Guide, Impressions Gallery 2011

External links
 

British artists
Black British artists
British women artists
Living people
1959 births